Highway 696 is a highway in the Canadian province of Saskatchewan. It runs from Highway 3 to Highway 24.

Highway 696 passes near the community of Ranger.

See also 
Roads in Saskatchewan
Transportation in Saskatchewan

References 

696